Southern Borderlands dialect is a dialect of Polish language, spoken by the Polish minority in Ukraine. It is considered a branch of the Lesser Poland dialect by Zofia Kurzowa.

Citations

Notes

References 

Polish dialects
Languages of Ukraine